Anacithara subrissoina is a species of sea snail, a marine gastropod mollusk in the family Horaiclavidae.

Description
The length of this white shell varies between 5.6 mm and 8.4 mm.

Distribution
This marine species is endemic to South Africa and occurs off the continental shelf of Zululand and Natal

References

 Kilburn, R. N. "Turridae (Mollusca: Gastropoda) of southern Africa and Mozambique. Part 7. Subfamily Crassispirinae, section 2." Annals of the Natal Museum 35 (1994): 177–228.

External links
  Tucker, J.K. 2004 Catalog of recent and fossil turrids (Mollusca: Gastropoda). Zootaxa 682:1-1295.
 Biolib: Anacithara subrissoina

Endemic fauna of South Africa
subrissoina
Gastropods described in 1994